The Roll Ball World Cup is an international men's and women's international roll ball tournament organized by the International Roll Ball Federation (IRBF).

Summary

2011 World Cup

The first Roll Ball World Cup was held at the Shree Shiv Chhatrapati Sports Complex in Pune in Maharashtra state of the Republic of India. This was held from 17 April 2011 to 22 April 2011. Denmark was the winner and India was the runner-up.

2013 World Cup
The second World Cup was held in Nairobi, Kenya, from 3 to 6 October 2013. It was won by India by defeating the inaugural champions Iran in the final.

2015 World Cup
The hosts India won the third Roll Ball World Cup by beating Iran by 6–4 in the final. It was held in Pune in Balewadi Stadium.

2017 World Cup

The host was  Bangladesh and the venue was Dhaka. In the men's category India defeated Iran by 8–7 while the women defeated the same opponent by  6–4.

Results
 Teams :
2011 - 16 men
2013 - 10 men + 3 women
2015 - 27 men +  11 women - 14 to 20 December
2017 - 38 men + 27 women - 17 to 23 February

Men

Women

Medal table

Men

Women

References

External links 
 International Roll Ball Federation results page

Recurring sporting events established in 2011
Rollball
Rollball
Biennial sporting events